Einar Paul Albert Muni Lundborg (5 April 1896 – 27 January 1931) was a Swedish aviator.

Biography
He was born on 5 April 1896.

In 1928 he rescued Umberto Nobile after Nobile's airship crashed on the ice north of  Spitsbergen. He was later promoted to captain in the Swedish Air Force.

Before joining the airforce, Lundborg participated in the Finnish Civil War in 1918 and in the Estonian War of Independence in 1919–1920.

Lundborg was killed during a test flight of the Jaktfalken airplane at Malmslätt in 1931. He was survived by his wife Margareta, née Malmberg (1900–1981). He is buried in Linköping, Sweden.

Honours and awards
Estonian War of Independence
 Cross of Liberty 3rd class II phase (August 17, 1920)
 Estonia's war memorial

Finnish War
 Cross of Liberty Class III with Swords and Class IV with Swords (Finland)
 Order of the White Rose of Finland, Commander 2nd class
 Finnish gallantry medal, Phase II
 Swedish Brigadier gallantry medal
 Medal of Tampere

Russian Army in the Northwest
 Order of St. Vladimir, 4th class with Swords
 Order of St. Anna, 3rd class with Swords

German Army
 Iron Cross,  I and II Classes

Bibliography
 När Nobile Räddades: Mina Upplevelser Under Den Svenska Spetsbergs Expeditionen 1928 (published in 1928 in Swedish) - Title in English: 'When Nobile Was Rescued: My Experiences During The Swedish Spetsbergs Expedition 1928'. The publication includes a fold-out map of Spitsbergen.

1896 births
1931 deaths
Military personnel from Kolkata
People of the Finnish Civil War (White side)
Recipients of the Order of the Cross of Liberty, 3rd Class
Recipients of the Order of St. Vladimir, 4th class
Recipients of the Order of St. Anna, 3rd class
Recipients of the Iron Cross (1914), 1st class
Victims of aviation accidents or incidents in Sweden
Swedish Air Force officers
Swedish expatriates in Finland